A widespread, destructive, and deadly tornado outbreak sequence affected the Southeastern United States from April 28 to May 2, 1953, producing 24 tornadoes, including five violent F4 tornadoes. The deadliest event of the sequence was an F4 tornado family that ravaged Robins Air Force Base in Warner Robins, Georgia, on April 30, killing at least 18 people and injuring 300 or more others. On May 1, a pair of F4 tornadoes also struck Alabama, causing a combined nine deaths and 15 injuries. Additionally, another violent tornado struck rural Tennessee after midnight on May 2, killing four people and injuring eight. Additionally, two intense tornadoes impacted Greater San Antonio, Texas, on April 28, killing three people and injuring 20 altogether. In all, 36 people were killed, 361 others were injured, and total damages reached $26.713 million (1953 USD). There were additional casualties from non-tornadic events as well, including a washout which caused a train derailment that injured 10.

Meteorological synopsis
Several low-pressure systems moved across North America from the end of April to the beginning of May. The first one dropped a cold front southward out of Canada. Another low came south-southeastward out of Wyoming, and moved into Northeastern New Mexico on April 29 with a cold front that moved across Oklahoma and Texas while a third low over South Texas produced a warm front and a small trough across that region. The second low absorbed the third one turned back north and occluded on April 30 while a low pressure trough produced a dryline and warm front, which was attached to a cold front on its eastern side, over the Southeast. A fourth and fifth low moved one right behind the other out of Nevada eastward into the region at the beginning of May. A sixth one formed over Iowa on May 1 and moved eastward into Illinois with a cold front dropping southwestward all the way into Texas. Atmospheric conditions were continually favorable in all of these cases for the development of severe weather and tornadoes throughout the period.

Confirmed tornadoes

Note: The Climatological Data National Summary reported some additional tornadoes that were not counted toward the final total:
April 28
A brief tornado was spotted aloft southwest of Greensburg, Kansas.
April 29
Several buildings were damaged by a tornado in Lake Charles, Louisiana that just barely missed the Weather Bureau office at the Lake Charles Airport.
Two tornadoes were spotted near Dighton, Kansas:
Tornado moved northeastward southwest of Dighton, causing no damage.
Tornado moved northeastward northeast of Dighton, "shaving wheat stubble" from the ground.
April 30
A possible tornado caused damage in Beaver Rain, Georgia near the town of Norcross.
Another possible tornado caused heavy damage in Baldwin County, Georgia while attendant rains caused additional damage.
May 2
A wind damage report in Sumter, South Carolina was noted to have possibly been a tornado. This event also caused a fatality.

April 28 event

April 29 event

April 30 event

May 1 event

May 2 event

Warner Robins, Georgia/Robins Air Force Base

This catastrophic, violent F4 tornado was first observed as a funnel cloud 5 minutes before it touched down. It immediately became intense as it moved east-northeastward and caused major damage as it struck the city farm. It then tore through a large housing project just south of Downtown Warner Robins. Terrific winds that well exceeded  destroyed 275 apartment units, 65 homes, and 25 trailers while heavily damaging 84 other apartment units, and 135 other homes. The high death and injury toll was mainly caused by this as people were hit by flying bricks and other debris. The tornado was filmed as it passed through Robins Air Force Base before it dissipated shortly thereafter.

600 families were affected as the tornado severely damaged or destroyed 340 residences, many of which were obliterated. 1,000 other housing units received lesser damage as well. There were 18 deaths and 300 injuries and losses totaled a staggering $25 million. Hail as large as golf balls also accompanied the tornado, although the damage it caused was indistinguishable to the total losses. Grazulis listed 19 fatalities instead of the official 18 and listed the event as a long-tracked tornado that included the three other tornadoes produced by this supercell.

Millerville–Ashland–Lineville, Alabama

This large, violent F4 tornado developed north of Millerville. Moving northeastward, the tornado then struck a store in Haskins Crossroads along SR 9. Nine people in the store were saved when a pickup truck besides the store caught and held the roof of the building after a wall was blown in, although one woman was hospitalized due to a back injury. One of the occupants' home, which was right next to the store was obliterated and swept away while also damaging farm equipment and injuring cows. The tornado then weakened momentarily before becoming violent again south of Ashland, destroying several homes. Two people were critically injured in one the homes before dying at the hospital two hours later. Another house containing seven people was leveled, killing three people and critically injuring the four others. The tornado then weakened and dissipated just south of Lineville. Much of its path was along or parallel to SR 9.

In all, of the approximately 170 structures hit, 19 homes and 36 other buildings were destroyed, including a gas station that was leveled, while 50 other homes and 57 other buildings were damaged. Chickens were killed and stripped of their feathers as well. There were seven fatalities, 12 injures, and $250,000 in damage.

Idlewild–Niota, Tennessee

A total of 58 other homes and 89 farm buildings were damaged as well. The tornado crossed over Brickell Ridge east-southeast of Walnut Grove and dissipated near Niota.

Three of the four fatalities from the tornado were in one family and eight other people were injured, with losses totaling $250,000. According to Grazulis, the fourth death may have been unrelated to the tornado when a plane crashed because of the storm.

Non-tornadic impacts
On April 29, severe thunderstorms with torrential rainfall and high winds struck all of Louisiana. Several towns also saw homes, streets, and other properties flooded and several highways were closed. A washout caused five cars of the Southern Belle passenger train to derail near Montgomery, injuring 10. Three fatalities were also reported throughout the state and 1,000 people were evacuated from their homes in Alexandria due to flooding. This same line of storms moved through all of Mississippi, where similar impacts took place. One person was killed at Byhalta while two others were injured in Natchez by a landslide.  winds caused widespread tree and powerline damage and 50 families were evacuated from Jackson due to flooding. In Vicksburg, the site of a massive F5 tornado in December later that year,  of rain fell in only eight hours, leaving much of the region flooded out. Heavy rainfall and winds in Columbia, South Carolina led to several indirect injuries due to vehicle accidents while strong winds in Franklin, Indiana ripped a roof off of a packing plant and slammed it against a dwelling, injuring two of its occupants. A squall line moved throughout the Southeast and Mid-Atlantic at the beginning of May, bringing more damage due to wind, hail, heavy rain, and flooding across the region.

Aftermath
The town of Warner Robins suffered catastrophic damage from the F4 tornado as numerous structures were flattened. At the time of the event, the city had 12 sirens, but none were located on Georgia/Robins AFB itself. Additionally, the radar technology at the time did not have the ability to detect the tornado. As a result, no formal tornado warning was issued and many people were caught off guard by its arrival. The Warner Robins F4 tornado was also one of the first tornadoes to ever be filmed. It was rumored that airman named Vince Rupert, an amateur cinematographer, was the one who captured it before being killed by flying debris. However, this information was proven to be just a myth as it actually filmed by Sgt. Lewis Prochniak, a Minnesota native and amateur film enthusiast. He took cover with his family just as the tornado was moving over his house and was not injured.

See also
List of North American tornadoes and tornado outbreaks
May 1960 tornado outbreak sequence
1999 Oklahoma tornado outbreak

Notes

References

Sources

External links
 Archive Video: EF-4 tornado strikes Houston Co. in 1953
 EF-4 tornado hits Houston County (1953)
 1953 Warner-Robins Air Force Base Georgia Tornado
 Millerville-Lineville, AL F4 Tornado – May 1, 1953

Tornadoes of 1953
1953-04
Tornadoes in Oklahoma
Tornadoes in Nebraska
Tornadoes in Texas
Tornadoes in Louisiana
Tornadoes in Georgia (U.S. state)
Tornadoes in Virginia
Tornadoes in North Carolina
Tornadoes in Alabama
Tornadoes in Tennessee
Tornado 1953-04
Tornado 1953-04
Tornado 1953-04